Aramis (1977–1989) was a Hanoverian gelding, a showjumper ridden by Mario Deslauriers who competed for Canada at the 1984 Olympics in Los Angeles, where the Canadians took a team fourth place.  Aramis also won the 1984 World Cup in showjumping.

Pedigree

References

External links
 History of Argentan Line

Canadian show jumping horses
Individual warmbloods
Individual male horses
Hanoverian horses
1977 animal births
1989 animal deaths
Horses in the Olympics